Spangles is a 1926 silent drama film produced and distributed by Universal Pictures. It was directed by Frank O'Connor and starred Marian Nixon, Pat O'Malley and Hobart Bosworth.

A surviving print of the film was preserved at UCLA Film and Television and it is out on DVD.

Cast
Marian Nixon - 'Spangles' Delancy
Pat O'Malley - Dick Hale, Dick Radley
Hobart Bosworth - Robert 'Big Bill' Bowman
Gladys Brockwell - Mlle. Dazie
Jay Emmett - Jack Milford
James Conly - Biff - a Halfwit
Grace Gordon - Davidina - Bearded Lady
Paul Howard - Armless Man
Tiny Ward - Goliath - A Giant
Charles Becker - Little Tommy Tumtack - A Dwarf
Nellie Lane - Fat Lady
Clarence Wertz - Rawlins
Harry Schultz - Strong Man
Herbert Shelly - Skeleton

unbilled
Walter Brennan - Lunch Counterman
Joe Martin - Joe Martin - The Chimp

References

External links

allmovie/synopsis; Spangles

1926 films
American silent feature films
Universal Pictures films
Films based on American novels
1926 drama films
Silent American drama films
American black-and-white films
Films directed by Frank O'Connor
1920s American films